Reading Football Club, established in 1871, is an association football club based in Reading.

Key
The list is currently updated to include all players who have joined the club since 1991. Those who joined before that date still need to be added.
The list is sorted by the year the player joined the club. If more than one player joined in the same year then they are sorted alphabetically.

Player
Players listed in italics spent their entire career with the club on loan.

Club years
Counted as the years the player signed for, and left the club.

Appearances
League and total appearances are sourced to Royals Record from 1991–92 to 1995–96, and Soccerbase from 1996–97 onwards.

International career
Players who made international appearances only have the highest level at which they played listed.
A player's senior international team is sourced to National Football Teams whilst appearances at age group level are sourced to the Association of Football Statisticians. Players not covered by the above are sourced as needed in the "Refs" column.

Players with fewer than 25 appearances

Players with 25 or more appearances

Notes

References

Players
 
Reading
Association football player non-biographical articles